List of major annual events in Zürich, Switzerland, by month.

See also
 Culture of Zürich

References

External links
 Event Calendar zuerich.com

Culture of Zürich
Tourist attractions in Zürich
Annual
Zurich
Zurich
Zurich